Septalites is a genus of cornulitid tubeworms. Their shells lack vesicular wall structure and have a smooth lumen filled with numerous transverse septa. They are externally covered with transverse ridges. Their fossils are known only from the Silurian of Gotland.

References

Protostome enigmatic taxa
Tentaculita
Silurian animals
Fossils of Sweden